Lt. Col. William Robert Royal (March 16, 1905 – May 8, 1997) was an American scuba diver in the United States Air Force and amateur archeologist. In the late 1950s, he and other scuba divers found artifacts and human bones from at least seven individuals in Warm Mineral Springs. A partially burned log found in association with some of the human bones was radiocarbon dated to about 10,000 years ago. If the bones were the same age as the log, then the bones were the oldest known evidence of human occupation in Florida at the time.

Early years and war service 
Royal was born in Bay City, Michigan, on March 16, 1905. He moved to Manatee County, Florida, during the Great Depression and operated a passenger airplane service in the Bahamas and Cuba in the late 1930s. He served in the United States Army Air Corps during World War II, during which he rode and killed sharks underwater in the Pacific Ocean. He retired from active duty with the rank of major in 1945. Between World War II and the Korean War, Royal lived in Detroit and Venice, Florida and worked as a building contractor. In 1951 Royal was recalled to active duty, serving until 1958 as a civil engineer at Air Force bases around the world. It was during this period that Royal took up recreational diving. Over the course of his career as an underwater diver, Royal dived in the Atlantic, Pacific and Indian Oceans and the Caribbean, Mediterranean and Black Seas. In 1958 Royal retired from active duty with the rank of lieutenant colonel. He returned to Venice, Florida, working as a builder.

Underwater archeologist 
In 1959 Royal began to investigate Little Salt Spring in North Port Charlotte, Florida. Royal discovered an underwater cave containing stalactites, which could only have formed when the cave was dry some 6000 years earlier. Royal and other divers, including ichthyologist Eugenie Clark, found human and animal bones in the spring, suggesting that the cave was inhabited in prehistoric times. Royal and the other divers expanded their investigation to Warm Mineral Springs, where they found sedimentary layers of animal and human bones and plant matter, including a three-foot-long burned log embedded in clay.

Royal and Clark tried to interest Dr. John Mann Goggin in their discovery, but Goggin was skeptical of their theory that Warm Mineral Springs had been inhabited by humans 6000 years earlier. At this time humans were not believed to have arrived in Florida until about 3500 years ago. Goggin was also unimpressed by Royal and Clark's credentials to engage in archeology. Clark arranged for the Scripps Institute of Oceanography to carbon date a piece of the burned log, which was found to be 10,000 years old.

In summer 1959 the group's finds at Warm Mineral Springs were filmed for the Huntley-Brinkley Report on NBC television. On July 11, while the television cameras were rolling, Royal discovered a human brain in a state of natural preservation inside a human skull which was part of a complete skeleton at Warm Mineral Springs. The unfortunate result was that the finds at Warm Mineral Springs were widely believed to be a hoax due to the unlikely coincidence of the brain being found during the television filming. Seven years later, the skeleton from which the brain came was carbon-dated to between 7,140 and 7,580 years old.

For the next twelve years, Royal attempted to convince qualified archeologists to examine his finds. From 1960 to 1965 he worked as an Air Force contractor in Texas and New Mexico, retiring from the Air Force Reserve in 1965. In 1970 Royal moved back to Florida and began diving at Warm Mineral Springs seven days a week, searching for material that would convince scientists to investigate the site. In 1971, Carl J. Clausen, Florida's State Underwater Archeologist, spearheaded an investigation of Little Salt Spring. Clausen believed that the Warm Mineral Springs site had been significantly disturbed by Royal, rendering it useless for archeology. The 1971-1972 exploration of Little Salt Spring, in which Sheck Exley participated, included a full-scale archeological excavation.

On March 18, 1972, Royal suffered decompression sickness after becoming trapped in the cave at the bottom of Warm Mineral Springs. Royal recovered after recompression treatment at the Naval Ordnance Laboratory in Fort Lauderdale, Florida, but suffered dysbaric osteonecrosis as a result of the accident, necessitating the placement of a platinum cap on the ball of his right femur.

In 1972 Wilburn Cockrell succeeded Clausen as Florida State Underwater Archeologist. After a diving excursion with a group which included Royal, Cockrell became more enthusiastic about the Warm Mineral Springs site despite Clausen's prior misgivings. Cockrell dived with Royal at Warm Mineral Springs, where Royal showed him a human jawbone he had found pinned underneath a heavy rock. In 1973 Cockrell excavated other human bones and a spear-thrower hook at the same location, which may be the oldest known intentional burial site in North America. The jawbone and the skull to which it belonged were carbon-dated to over 10,000 years old.

Later years 
In 1974 Royal was honored by Dick Stone, the Secretary of State of Florida, for his contributions to scientific knowledge. In later years Royal also investigated underwater midden deposits in the Gulf of Mexico west of Venice, Florida, and fossils and artifacts in Salt Creek, a drainage from Warm Mineral Springs to the Myakka River. He continued swimming daily into his 91st year. Royal died on May 8, 1997, at the age of 92. His ashes were placed in a tunnel at Warm Mineral Springs. He was survived by his wife, Shirley E. Royal, whom he married in 1970 and who died in 2001.

References

Publications

External links 
 Unofficial Warm Mineral Springs site

1905 births
1997 deaths
American civil engineers
American builders
American underwater divers
Burials in Florida
People from Bay City, Michigan
People from Venice, Florida
Place of death missing
Underwater archaeologists
United States Air Force officers
United States Army Air Forces pilots of World War II
People from Manatee County, Florida
People from North Port, Florida
Military personnel from Michigan